RAAF Base Scherger  is a Royal Australian Air Force (RAAF) military air base located approximately  east of Weipa on the western side of Cape York Peninsula in Queensland, Australia. One of three bare bases in a chain of bases across Australia's top end, the base is occupied by a caretaker staff and can be activated at relatively short notice. The base was constructed by troops drawn mainly from the 17th Construction Squadron, in what is believed to have been the biggest project undertaken by the Royal Australian Engineers at the time.

Opened on 5 August 1998 by the Prime Minister, John Howard, the base was named in honour of Air Chief Marshal Sir Frederick Scherger who was the Australian Chief of the Air Staff (now known as Chief of Air Force) from March 1957 to May 1961 and the equivalent of what is now Chief of the Defence Force from 1961 to 1966.

Role and facilities
As a 'bare base' Scherger's role is to provide the RAAF and other services with the necessary infrastructure to support forward deployed forces during a crisis. While the base has facilities to cater for 400 personnel in fixed accommodation, 1,000 personnel in tent lines and about 40 aircraft, it is normally only manned by four Air Force personnel who are responsible for caretaker duties. During peacetime RAAF Base Scherger hosts, on average, one major exercise per year in which the base is fully activated through the arrival of RAAF units based elsewhere in Australia.

Scherger Immigration Detention Centre 
In October 2010, the Scherger Immigration Detention Centre was opened at Scherger RAAF Base, and this facility provided accommodation for 300 single adult males, with a maximum capacity of 596 males. The centre closed in 2014.

See also
 List of airports in Queensland
 List of Royal Australian Air Force installations

References

External links
 RAAF Base Scherger at airforce.gov.au
Exercise Kakadu VII
Air Force News: "Going Active"
RAAF Base Scherger opened near Weipa
Scherger Immigration Detention Centre

Royal Australian Air Force bases
Airports in Queensland
1998 establishments in Australia
Airports established in 1998
Military installations established in 1998
Military buildings and structures in Queensland
Military installations in Queensland